Thomas George Stemberg (January 18, 1949 – October 23, 2015) was an American businessman, investor, and philanthropist. He was a pioneer of the office supplies superstore industry, most notably for founding office supply retail chain Staples Inc. with Leo Kahn.

Early life and education 
Stemberg was born on January 18, 1949, in Orange, New Jersey, the son of immigrants from Vienna, Austria, Erika (née Ratzer) and Oscar Michael Stemberg. His father was a lawyer who became a restaurateur. His father was Jewish and his mother was Catholic.

At Harvard College, he headed on managerial roles at Harvard Student Agencies, a hands-on organization of campus businesses, and the Harvard Independent, a newly established student newspaper. In 1973, Stemberg graduated from the Harvard Business School receiving his M.B.A. as a George F. Baker Scholar.

Career 
He started his career with the Jewel Company's Star Markets where he became the vice president for the company's sales and merchandising division.

In 1986, Stemberg started Staples with backing from private equity firms, including Hambro International Ventures, Harvard Management, Bessemer Ventures, Adler & Company, and Bain Capital; Bain co-founder Mitt Romney served on the company's board of directors for the next 15 years. By 1999, Staples had worldwide sales of over US$7 billion, with more than one thousand superstores, mail order catalogs, e-commerce outlets, and a contract business.

In 2005, Stemberg joined Highland Capital Partners, a venture capital firm, in Lexington, Massachusetts, as managing general partner.

Stemberg had an estimated net worth of $202 million, he was a philanthropist who donated funds in areas pertaining to education.

Stemberg, a political supporter of Mitt Romney since Romney ran for the U.S. Senate in 1994, spoke on Romney's behalf at the 2012 Republican National Convention. Stemberg encouraged Romney to make healthcare more accessible, which led Romney to reform healthcare in the commonwealth.

Personal life 
In 2012, Stemberg was involved in a legal dispute with his first wife, Maureen Sullivan.

Stemberg died on October 23, 2015, from gastric cancer. He was 66 years old.

References 

1949 births
2015 deaths
Staples Inc. people
American company founders
American grocers
American people of Austrian-Jewish descent
American retail chief executives
Businesspeople from Massachusetts
Businesspeople from New Jersey
Harvard University alumni
Harvard Business School alumni
Massachusetts Republicans
People from Orange, New Jersey
Private equity and venture capital investors
Retail company founders
Deaths from stomach cancer
Deaths from cancer in Massachusetts
20th-century American businesspeople